Henry E. Krueger (May 14, 1882 – November 30, 1960) was a member of the Wisconsin State Assembly.

Biography
Krueger was born on May 14, 1882 in Beaver Dam, Wisconsin. He graduated from the University of Wisconsin in 1907. On October 3, 1911, he married Martha Fisher. He died at a Beaver Dam hospital on November 30, 1960.

Career
Krueger was a member of the Assembly during the 1911, 1913, 1933, 1935 and 1937 sessions. In addition, he was chairman (similar to mayor), clerk, and assessor of Beaver Dam. He was a Democrat.

References

External links

People from Beaver Dam, Wisconsin
Democratic Party members of the Wisconsin State Assembly
Mayors of places in Wisconsin
City and town clerks
1882 births
1960 deaths
20th-century American politicians